Michael Burke (11 October 1843 – 21 March 1909) was an Australian politician.

He was born at Tamworth to shepherd Thomas Burke and Margaret Dwyer. He was a carpenter and possibly a policeman before entering politics. On 20 September 1866 he married Catherine Agnes Leahy, with whom he had six children (one of these was Frank Burke, later Speaker of the New South Wales Legislative Assembly). In 1885 he was elected to the New South Wales Legislative Assembly for Tamworth, but he did not re-contest in 1887. Burke died at Newtown in 1909.

References

 

1843 births
1909 deaths
Members of the New South Wales Legislative Assembly
19th-century Australian politicians